The 2018 NFL season was the 99th season of the National Football League (NFL) and the 53rd of the Super Bowl era. The season began on September 6, 2018, with the NFL Kickoff Game with the defending Super Bowl LII champion Philadelphia Eagles defeating the Atlanta Falcons. The season concluded with Super Bowl LIII, the league's championship game, on February 3, 2019, at Mercedes-Benz Stadium in Atlanta, Georgia, in which the New England Patriots defeated the Los Angeles Rams for their sixth Super Bowl championship and their third title in five years.

Player movement 
The 2018 NFL League year and trading period began on March 14. On March 9, clubs were allowed to exercise options for 2018 on players who have option clauses in their contracts, submit qualifying offers to their pending restricted free agents and submit a Minimum Salary Tender to retain exclusive negotiating rights to their players with expiring 2017 contracts and who have fewer than three accrued seasons of free agent credit. Teams were required to be under the salary cap using the "Top-51" definition (in which the 51 highest paid-players on the team's payroll must have a combined salary cap hit below the actual cap). On March 12, clubs were allowed to contact and enter into contract negotiations with the agents of players who were set to become unrestricted free agents.

Free agency 
Over 550 players were eligible for some form of free agency during the free agency period. Notable players to change teams include:

 Quarterbacks Sam Bradford (Minnesota to Arizona), Kirk Cousins (Washington to Minnesota), Case Keenum (Minnesota to Denver), and A. J. McCarron (Cincinnati to Buffalo).
 Running backs Isaiah Crowell (Cleveland to New York Jets), Carlos Hyde (San Francisco to Cleveland), Frank Gore (Indianapolis to Miami), Dion Lewis (New England to Tennessee), Jerick McKinnon (Minnesota to San Francisco), and Adrian Peterson (Arizona to Washington)
 Wide receivers Danny Amendola (New England to Miami), Allen Hurns (Jacksonville to Dallas), Jordy Nelson (Green Bay to Oakland), Allen Robinson (Jacksonville to Chicago), and Sammy Watkins (Los Angeles Rams to Kansas City)
 Tight ends Jimmy Graham (Seattle to Green Bay), Austin Seferian-Jenkins (New York Jets to Jacksonville), and Marcedes Lewis (Jacksonville to Green Bay)
 Offensive linemen Cameron Fleming (New England to Dallas), Andrew Norwell (Carolina to Jacksonville), Mike Pouncey (Miami to Los Angeles Chargers), Justin Pugh (New York Giants to Arizona), Weston Richburg (New York Giants to San Francisco), Nate Solder (New England to New York Giants), Josh Sitton (Chicago to Miami), and Travis Swanson (Detroit to New York Jets)
 Defensive linemen Adrian Clayborn (Atlanta to New England), Vinny Curry (Philadelphia to Tampa Bay), Sheldon Richardson (Seattle to Minnesota), Ndamukong Suh (Miami to Los Angeles Rams), Star Lotulelei (Carolina to Buffalo), and Muhammad Wilkerson (New York Jets to Green Bay)
 Linebackers Demario Davis (New York Jets to New Orleans), Trent Murphy (Washington to Buffalo), Tahir Whitehead (Detroit to Oakland), and Avery Williamson (Tennessee to New York Jets)
 Defensive backs Malcolm Butler (New England to Tennessee), Morgan Burnett (Green Bay to Pittsburgh), T. J. Carrie (Oakland to Cleveland), Ross Cockrell (New York Giants to Carolina), E. J. Gaines (Buffalo to Cleveland), Marcus Gilchrist (Houston to Oakland), Trumaine Johnson (Los Angeles Rams to New York Jets), Tyrann Mathieu (Arizona to Houston), Rashaan Melvin (Indianapolis to Oakland), Eric Reid (San Francisco To Carolina), Patrick Robinson (Philadelphia to New Orleans), and Richard Sherman (Seattle to San Francisco)
 Kicker Sebastian Janikowski (Oakland to Seattle)
 Punter Marquette King (Oakland to Denver)

Trades 
The following notable trades were made during the 2018 league year:

 March 14: Miami traded WR Jarvis Landry to Cleveland for a 2018 fourth round selection (123rd overall) and a 2019 seventh round selection.
 March 14: Buffalo traded QB Tyrod Taylor to Cleveland for a 2018 third round selection (65th overall).
 March 14: Buffalo traded T Cordy Glenn, a 2018 first round selection (21st overall), and a 2018 fifth round selection (158th overall) to Cincinnati for a 2018 first round selection (12th overall) and a 2018 sixth round selection (187th overall).
 March 14: Green Bay traded CB Damarious Randall, a 2018 fourth round selection (114th overall), and a 2018 fifth round selection (150th overall) to Cleveland for QB DeShone Kizer, a 2018 fourth round selection (101st overall), and a 2018 fifth round selection (138th overall)
 March 14: Cleveland traded DT Danny Shelton and a 2018 fifth round selection (159th overall) to New England for a 2019 third round selection.
 March 14: Kansas City traded QB Alex Smith to Washington in exchange for CB Kendall Fuller and a 2018 third round selection (78th overall).
 March 14: Kansas City traded CB Marcus Peters and a 2018 sixth round draft selection (196th overall) to the Los Angeles Rams in exchange for a 2018 fourth round selection (124th overall) and a 2019 second round selection.
 March 14: Denver traded CB Aqib Talib to the Los Angeles Rams in exchange for a 2018 fifth round selection (160th overall).
 March 14: The Los Angeles Rams traded LB Alec Ogletree and a 2019 seventh round draft selection to the New York Giants in exchange for a 2018 fourth round selection (135th overall) and a 2018 sixth round selection (176th overall).
 March 14: The Los Angeles Rams traded DE Robert Quinn and a 2018 sixth round selection to Miami in exchange for a 2018 fourth round selection and a 2018 sixth round selection.
 March 14: Seattle traded DE Michael Bennett and a 2018 seventh round selection to Philadelphia for WR Marcus Johnson and a 2018 fifth round selection.
 March 14: Philadelphia traded WR Torrey Smith to Carolina for CB Daryl Worley.
 March 18: Oakland traded WR Cordarrelle Patterson and a 2018 sixth round selection (210th overall) to New England for a 2018 fifth round selection (159th overall).
 March 22: The New York Giants traded DE Jason Pierre-Paul and their 2018 fourth round selection (102nd overall) to Tampa Bay in exchange for a 2018 third round selection (69th overall) and a 2018 fourth round selection (108th overall).
 March 29: Washington traded S Su'a Cravens, a 2018 fourth round selection (113th overall), and a 2018 fifth round selection (149th overall) to Denver in exchange for a 2018 fourth round selection (109th overall), two 2018 fifth round selections (142nd and 163rd overall), and a conditional 2020 selection.
April 3: New England traded WR Brandin Cooks and a 2018 fourth round selection (136th overall) to the Los Angeles Rams for a 2018 first round selection (23rd overall) and a 2018 sixth round selection (198th overall).
April 26: Pittsburgh traded WR Martavis Bryant to Oakland for a 2018 third round selection (79th overall).
August 29: The New York Jets traded QB Teddy Bridgewater and a 2019 sixth-round selection to New Orleans for a 2019 third round selection.
September 1: Oakland traded DE/OLB Khalil Mack, a 2020 second round selection, and a conditional 2020 fifth round selection to Chicago in exchange for a 2019 first round selection, a 2020 first round selection, a 2020 third round selection, and a 2019 sixth round selection.
September 17: Cleveland traded WR Josh Gordon and a conditional 2019 seventh round selection to New England in exchange for a 2019 fifth round selection.
October 19: Cleveland traded RB Carlos Hyde to Jacksonville in exchange for a fifth round pick in the 2019 NFL Draft.
October 23: Oakland traded WR Amari Cooper to Dallas in exchange for a 2019 first round selection.
October 30: Denver traded WR Demaryius Thomas and a 2019 seventh round selection to Houston for a 2019 fourth round selection and a 2019 seventh round selection.
October 30: Detroit traded WR Golden Tate to Philadelphia for a 2019 third round selection.
October 30: Jacksonville traded DE Dante Fowler to the Los Angeles Rams for a 2019 third round selection and a 2020 fifth round selection.
October 30: Green Bay traded S Ha Ha Clinton-Dix to Washington for a 2019 fourth round selection and RB Ty Montgomery to Baltimore for a 2020 seventh round selection.

Retirements 

S Kam Chancellor: Four-time Pro Bowler, two-time second-team All-Pro safety, and Super Bowl XLVIII champion. He played his entire eight-year career with the Seattle Seahawks.
CB Antonio Cromartie: Four-time Pro Bowler and one-time first-team All-Pro. Cromartie played for the San Diego Chargers, New York Jets, Arizona Cardinals, and Indianapolis Colts during his 11-year career, before spending the entire 2017 season as an unsigned free agent.
DE Elvis Dumervil: Five-time Pro Bowler and two-time first-team All-Pro. Dumervil played for the Denver Broncos, Baltimore Ravens, and San Francisco 49ers during his 12-year career.
DE Dwight Freeney: Seven-time Pro Bowler, four-time All-Pro (three first-team, one second-team), and Super Bowl XLI champion. Freeney played for the Indianapolis Colts, San Diego Chargers, Arizona Cardinals, Atlanta Falcons, Seattle Seahawks, and Detroit Lions during his 16-year career.
LB James Harrison: Five-time Pro Bowler, four-time All-Pro (two first-team, two second-team), two-time Super Bowl champion (XL and XLIII), and 2008 Defensive Player of the Year. Harrison played for the Pittsburgh Steelers, Cincinnati Bengals, and New England Patriots during his 15-year career.
 KR Devin Hester: Four-time Pro Bowler and four-time All-Pro (three first-team, one second-team). Hester played for the Chicago Bears, Atlanta Falcons, Baltimore Ravens, and Seattle Seahawks during his 11-year career. He spent 2017 out of football before announcing his retirement in early 2018.
G Richie Incognito: Four-time Pro Bowler. Played for the Buffalo Bills, Miami Dolphins, and St. Louis Rams during his 12-year career.
C Nick Mangold: Seven-time Pro Bowler and three-time All-Pro (two first-team, one second-team). Played his entire 11-year career with the New York Jets. He had spent the 2017 season out of football after the Jets released him.
CB Darrelle Revis: Seven-time Pro Bowler, four-time first-team All-Pro, and Super Bowl XLIX champion. Revis played for the New York Jets, Tampa Bay Buccaneers, New England Patriots, and Kansas City Chiefs during his 11-year career.
OT Joe Thomas: Ten-time Pro Bowler and nine-time All-Pro (seven first-team, two second-team). Played his entire 11-year career for the Cleveland Browns. A deteriorating left knee contributed to Thomas's retirement.
 TE Jason Witten: Eleven-time Pro Bowler, four-time All Pro (two first-team, two second-team), and 2012 Walter Payton Man of the Year. Witten played 15 seasons, all with the Dallas Cowboys. He took a job with ESPN as their Monday Night Football color commentator. However he came out of retirement for the 2019 NFL season, with the Cowboys.

Other retirements

Draft 

The 2018 NFL Draft was held from April 26 to 28 at AT&T Stadium in Arlington, Texas. This was the first draft to take place in an NFL stadium, and the first to be held in Texas. The Cleveland Browns selected Baker Mayfield with the first overall pick.

Officiating changes

Offseason 
The following officials were hired:

 Land Clark (Field Judge)
 Matt Edwards (Side Judge)
 Chad Hill (Side Judge)
 Anthony Jeffries (Field Judge)
 Tony Josselyn (Back Judge)
 Brian Matoren (Replay Official)
 Mark Stewart (Line Judge)
 Don Willard (Field Judge)

Four referees retired during the 2018 off-season, the most to do so since records on the statistics have been kept.

 Ed Hochuli: At the time of his retirement, Hochuli was the league's longest-tenured referee, having served with the league for 28 seasons, 26 as a head referee. He was succeeded by his son, Shawn Hochuli.
 Terry McAulay: McAulay spent 20 seasons as an official, 17 as a head referee, and officiated three Super Bowls. McAulay will work as a rules analyst for NBC's Sunday Night Football. Shawn Smith, an umpire since , was promoted to replace McAulay.
 Gene Steratore: Steratore spent 15 seasons as an official and was the referee of Super Bowl LII. Steratore was involved in the controversial ruling known as the Calvin Johnson rule, as well as the infamous use of an index card during a game between the Oakland Raiders and Dallas Cowboys. He was one of two officials who also covered NCAA Division I basketball games. Steratore accepted an offer from CBS to fill its rules analyst position, which had been vacant since 2015. Umpire Clay Martin was promoted to referee to replace Steratore.
 Jeff Triplette: Triplette had spent 22 years as an official with the NFL, 19 as a head referee. Alex Kemp replaced Triplette.

Other officials retiring:

 Jim Howey (Down Judge)
 Ed Walker (Down Judge)
 Ron Marinucci (Line Judge)
 Buddy Horton (Field Judge)
 Jon Lucivansky (Field Judge)
 Laird Hayes (Side Judge)

In-season 
Down judge Hugo Cruz was fired for performance-related issues culminating with a missed false start during a Week 6 game between the Los Angeles Chargers and Cleveland Browns. It was the first time in the Super Bowl era that an official was dismissed in-season.

Rule changes 
The following playing rule changes have been approved by the Competition Committee for the 2018 season:
 Make permanent the current rule that changes the spot of the ball after a touchback on a kickoff to the 25-yard line. Prior to 2017, the ball was placed at the 20-yard line.
 Update the standards for a "catch" to have:
Two feet down or any body part other than the hands
Control of the ball
Make a "football move" such as making a 3rd step, reaching/extending to the line to gain, tucking the ball away, warding off defensive players, or have the ability to perform such an act.
The rule for receivers who were going to the ground during the catch process has been deleted. This is in response to several issues regarding the "going to the ground" rule, especially catches by Dallas Cowboys WR Dez Bryant in the 2014 NFL playoffs and one by Pittsburgh Steelers TE Jesse James in 2017 that were overturned due to this rule.
 Allow a designated member of the officiating department (for 2018, senior vice president of officiating Al Riveron, vice president officiating evaluation and development Wayne Mackie, and vice president of instant replay and administration Russel Yurk) to instruct game officials to disqualify any player who commits a flagrant non-football act on the field for a foul called on the field. This is in response to a situation where New England Patriots tight end Rob Gronkowski intentionally inflicted a late hit on Buffalo Bills defensive back Tre'Davious White causing a concussion to White. Gronkowski was not ejected for the foul on the field, but did receive a one-game suspension after the NFL's review of the play.
Illegally batting a ball on a scrimmage down will incur a loss of down in addition to the previous 10-yard penalty.
In overtime, when a team is ahead by 3 points, a down will run to its conclusion and all applicable points will score, even if there is a loss of possession. Previously, the offense of the trailing team could not legally score if they lost and regained possession and reached the opponent's end zone all on the same play. The rule remains that if there is a double change of possession on a play with one team in the lead, it is the last play of the game.
If a team scores a touchdown on the final play of regulation which either gives them the victory or leaves them three or more points behind, no extra-point conversion try will be needed.
A ball carrier may slide either head first or feet first to be considered giving himself up on the play, and he is afforded all protections previously provided to a runner sliding feet first.

The following bylaws and resolutions were passed:
Make permanent the liberalization of workout rules for draft prospects.
For a one-year trial period, liberalize the rules for re-signing a player on waivers.
Players on injured reserve can be traded.
Players with injuries deemed major can be placed directly on injured reserve without clearing waivers.
The 10-day postseason waiver claiming period has been reduced to 1 day.
Players can be activated from injured reserve after eight games instead of eight weeks.
Teams have seven business days to complete an injury settlement instead of five.
Players in certain reserve list categories cannot be reinstated after a team's week 13 game. This restriction was previously applied to the last 30 days of the regular season.
Clarify roster procedures for players with military obligations.
For a one-year trial period, teams may contact a player who has been publicly announced to be released before the NFL lists the transaction on a Player Personnel Notice.

The following changes to the kickoff rules were approved at the NFL Spring Owners' Meeting on May 23, 2018:
 Players are required to line up for the kickoff as follows:
Five players on the kicking team must be on either side of the kicker
At least two players on each side must be lined up outside of the numbers and at least two additional players on each side must be lined up between the numbers and the hashmarks
Players on the kicking team (excluding the kicker) may only line up within 1 yard of the kickoff spot (the previous limit was 5 yards)
The receiving team must have eight players in a 15-yard "set-up zone" (measured from the receiving team's side of the restraining line 10 yards from the kickoff spot)
 No wedge blocks. Players would only be able to do a double-team block within the "set-up zone".
 Blocking is prohibited inside the restraining zone (10 yards from the kickoff spot) until the ball touches the ground or is touched in the field of play.
 Once a kickoff lands in the end zone, it would become an automatic touchback. Players will no longer have to "kneel" in the end zone to stop the play.
 Any player(s) being disqualified are subject to replay review.
 It is now a foul (15 yards) for players to lower their helmet to initiate and make contact with an opposing player. The fouling player risks disqualification if:
Player lowers his helmet to establish a linear body posture prior to initiating or making contact with the helmet
Player delivering the blow had an unobstructed path to his opponent
Contact was clearly avoidable (player delivering the blow had other options)

The chain crew was reduced by one member; the "X" marker, usually unseen on television but used to mark the start of an offensive drive, was eliminated.

In response to the recent National Anthem protests in the league the past two seasons, any player or staff member who is on the field during the performance of "The Star-Spangled Banner" must stand for the duration of the performance. Such players and staff members are not required to be on the field at that time and may wait in the locker room as an alternative. The NFL will not directly fine offending players or staff members for defying the rule, instead fining the teams, who will in turn have power to fine the players or staff members at their own discretion. The National Football League Players Association filed a grievance with the league over the policy on July 11.

2018 deaths 
The following people associated with the NFL (or AFL) died in 2018.

Members of the Pro Football Hall of Fame 

Tommy McDonald A 1998 inductee of the Pro Football Hall of Fame, McDonald played 12 seasons in the NFL, the majority of them with the Philadelphia Eagles, where he had the majority of his success. The six-time Pro Bowler and four-time All-Pro (first or second team) led the league in both receiving yards and receiving touchdowns in 1961 and was the last non-kicking position player to play without a facemask. He died September 24 at the age of 84.
Jim Taylor The nine-year veteran of the Green Bay Packers was the first member of the team's 1961–1968 dynasty to be inducted into the Hall as a 1976 inductee. The fullback, who played from 1958 through the first World Championship, appeared in five Pro Bowls, was named first or second team All-Pro six times, and led the league in both rushing touchdowns and yards in 1962, leading the latter category in 1961 as well. He finished his career on the inaugural roster of the New Orleans Saints. He died October 13, aged 83.

Team owners 
Paul Allen: Allen owned the Seattle Seahawks from 1996 until his death on October 15, at the age of 65. Allen left no wife or children, and his estate is believed to be in control of his sister, Jody Allen. Allen was also the owner of the NBA's Portland Trail Blazers, and part owner of MLS's Seattle Sounders FC.
Tom Benson: Benson owned the New Orleans Saints from 1985 until his death on March 15, at the age of 90. His wife Gayle Benson inherited the team.
Bob McNair: McNair died November 23 at the age of 81. He had owned the Houston Texans from the time of its establishment in 2002 until his death. His wife Janice McNair and his son Cal McNair took over as owners, and the government of Harris County, Texas' minority stake in the team precludes any incoming owner from relocating the team.
Alex Spanos: Spanos owned the Chargers from 1984 until his death; he had had senile dementia since 2008 and was not directly involved in the team's relocation from San Diego back to Los Angeles, which was largely orchestrated by his son Dean Spanos, who will head the family consortium that inherits the team. Spanos died October 9, aged 95.

Others 

Grady Alderman
Willie Brown
Billy Cannon
Dwight Clark
Lindon Crow
Bennie Cunningham
Keith Fahnhorst
Bill Fralic
Jim Garrett
Chris Gedney
Tom Heckert Jr.
Wes Hopkins
Wayne Huizenga
David Humm
Edwin Jackson
Ron Johnson
Billy Kinard
Chuck Knox
Vince Manuwai
Dick Modzelewski
Jeremy Nunley
Jack Patera
Gabriel Rivera
Isiah Robertson
Tim Rossovich
Kona Schwenke
Ed Schultz
Clyde Scott
Tony Sparano
George Taliaferro
Frank Varrichione
Manch Wheeler
Leon "Big Van Vader" White

Preseason 
Training camps for the 2018 season were held in late July through August. Teams started training camp no earlier than 15 days before the team's first scheduled preseason game.

The Pro Football Hall of Fame Game, in which the Baltimore Ravens defeated the Chicago Bears 17–16, was played on August 2; and was televised nationally by NBC. The Ravens, who made their first Hall of Fame Game appearance, were represented in the 2018 Hall of Fame class by former linebacker Ray Lewis, while the Bears were represented by former linebacker Brian Urlacher.

Regular season 
The 2018 regular season's 256 games were played over a 17-week schedule that began on September 6. Each of the league's 32 teams played a 16-game schedule, with one bye week for each team. The regular season concluded with a full slate of 16 games on December 30, all of which were intra-division matchups, as it had been since .

Scheduling formula
Under the NFL's current scheduling formula, each team plays the other three teams in its own division twice. In addition, a team plays against all four teams in one other division from each conference. The final two games on a team's schedule are against the two remaining teams in the same conference that finished in the same position in their respective divisions (e.g., the team that finished fourth in its division will play all three other teams in the conference that also finished fourth). The division pairings for 2018 were as follows:

The entire season schedule was released on April 19. Highlights of the 2018 season included:
 NFL Kickoff Game: The season began with the Kickoff Game on September 6, with Atlanta at defending Super Bowl LII champion Philadelphia; Philadelphia won, 18–12.
 NFL International Series:
 NFL London Games: Three games were played in London in 2018. All games were played at Wembley Stadium. The first game featured Seattle at Oakland, on October 14; this game was originally scheduled to be played at Tottenham Hotspur Stadium, but was relocated to Wembley when it was determined that the construction at Tottenham would not be finished in time. The two games originally slated to take place at Wembley were Tennessee at the Los Angeles Chargers on October 21 and Philadelphia at Jacksonville on October 28. This was the first time the London games were played on three consecutive weeks, a move the league has taken to try to streamline their London operations. Seattle, Los Angeles, and Philadelphia won these games.
 NFL Mexico Game: One game, Kansas City at the Los Angeles Rams on November 19, was scheduled to take place at Estadio Azteca in Mexico City. However, due to poor field conditions resulting from recent concerts and soccer games at the facility, as well as a "difficult rainy season," the NFL announced on November 13 that the game would be moved back to the Rams' home stadium, the Los Angeles Memorial Coliseum. Although attempts were made to re-sod the field, it failed an inspection by NFL officials. The Rams would beat the Chiefs 54–51, marking the highest-scoring game in Monday Night Football history.
 Thanksgiving Day: As has been the case since , three games were played on November 22: Chicago at Detroit and  Washington at Dallas in the traditional afternoon doubleheader, and Atlanta at New Orleans in the primetime game.  Chicago, Dallas, and New Orleans won these contests.
 Christmas Eve game: Christmas Eve, December 24, fell on a Monday in 2018. As was the case in 2007, a Monday Night Football game was scheduled between two western teams, the Denver at Oakland, with Oakland winning.  This marked the teams' record 18th matchup on MNF.

Scheduling changes 
When the entire season schedule was released on April 19, the league announced flexible scheduling for Saturday games in weeks 15 and 16. The final times of these games were announced on October 24:
 Week 7: The Cincinnati–Kansas City game was flexed from 1:00 p.m. ET on CBS to the 8:20 p.m. EDT slot on NBC, replacing the originally-scheduled Los Angeles Rams–San Francisco game, which was moved to 4:25 p.m. ET on CBS. This is the earliest NBC flex game since it took over the Sunday Night package in 2006.
 Week 10: The Miami–Green Bay game was moved from 1:00 p.m. ET to 4:25 p.m. ET on CBS. Additionally, the Arizona–Kansas City game, originally scheduled at 1:00 p.m. ET on Fox, was cross-flexed to CBS, in the same time slot.
 Week 11: The Minnesota–Chicago game was flexed from 1:00 p.m. ET on Fox to 8:20 p.m. ET on NBC, replacing the originally scheduled Pittsburgh–Jacksonville game which was moved to 1:00 p.m. ET on CBS. Additionally, the Philadelphia–New Orleans game was moved from 1:00 p.m. ET to 4:25 p.m. ET on Fox.
 Week 12: The Miami–Indianapolis game was moved from 1:00 p.m. ET to 4:25 p.m. ET on CBS.
 Week 13: The Los Angeles Chargers–Pittsburgh game originally scheduled for 1:00 p.m. ET on CBS was flexed to 8:20 p.m. ET on NBC, replacing the originally scheduled San Francisco–Seattle game which was moved to 4:25 p.m. ET on Fox.
 Week 14: The Los Angeles Rams–Chicago game originally scheduled for 1:00 p.m. ET on Fox was flexed to 8:20 p.m. ET on NBC, replacing the originally scheduled Pittsburgh–Oakland game which was moved to 4:25 p.m. ET on Fox.
 Week 15: The Houston–New York Jets started at 4:30 p.m., while the Cleveland–Denver game started at 8:20 p.m. EST, both games broadcast by NFL Network. And the Washington–Jacksonville game originally scheduled at 1:00 p.m. ET on Fox was cross-flexed to CBS, in the same time slot.
Week 16: Two games were moved to Saturday, December 22 on NFL Network: the Washington–Tennessee game started at 4:30 p.m. EST, while the Baltimore–Los Angeles Chargers game started at 8:20 p.m. EST. This marked the first time that games were rescheduled to a different day (excluding games rescheduled due to severe weather) under a new deal with NFL Network this season. In addition, the New York Giants–Indianapolis game originally scheduled at 1:00 p.m. ET on Fox was cross-flexed to CBS, in the same time slot.
 Week 17: The Indianapolis–Tennessee game originally scheduled for 1:00 p.m. ET on CBS, was selected as the final 8:20 p.m. NBC Sunday Night Football game of the season, which decided the final AFC wild card spot. Also, the Cincinnati–Pittsburgh, Cleveland–Baltimore, Oakland–Kansas City, Philadelphia–Washington, and Chicago–Minnesota  games were moved from 1:00 p.m. ET to 4:25 p.m. ET. with no change in network assignment.

Regular season standings

Division

Conference

Postseason 

The 2018 playoffs began on the weekend of January 5–6, 2019, with the Wild Card Playoff round. The four winners of those playoff games visited the top two seeds in each conference in the Divisional round games the weekend of January 12–13. The winners of those games advanced to the Conference Championship games on January 20. (In the event that both Los Angeles teams had advanced to their respective conference championships with both teams as the home team, one of the two games would have been postponed to the evening of January 21.) The 2019 Pro Bowl was held at Camping World Stadium in Orlando, Florida on January 27. Super Bowl LIII was held on February 3 at Mercedes-Benz Stadium in Atlanta.

Bracket

Records, milestones, and notable statistics 
Week 1
Adrian Peterson became the ninth player to rush for 100 touchdowns in a career.

Week 2
Frank Gore passed Curtis Martin to move up to fourth on the all-time rushing yards list with 14,103 career rushing yards.
Patrick Mahomes became the youngest quarterback to throw six touchdown passes in a game, at age 22 years and 364 days.

Week 3
Ryan Fitzpatrick became the first quarterback in NFL history to throw for at least 400 yards in three consecutive games.
The Minnesota Vikings tied the record for fewest rushing attempts in a game with six.  The record was previously set by the 1933 Chicago Cardinals and tied by the 2004 New England Patriots and 2006 Arizona Cardinals.

Week 4
Adam Vinatieri kicked his 566th career field goal, breaking the record for most field goals in a career previously held by Morten Andersen.

Week 5
Tom Brady threw his 500th career touchdown pass, becoming the third quarterback in NFL history to do so (joining Brett Favre and Peyton Manning) and becoming the first to do so playing on one team.
Tom Brady threw a touchdown pass to a 71st different receiver, breaking an NFL record previously held by Vinny Testaverde.
Drew Brees became the NFL's all-time leading passer with 71,941 passing yards, surpassing Brett Favre and Peyton Manning in the process.

Week 6
Tom Brady became the first quarterback in NFL history to reach 200 regular season wins.

Week 7
Drew Brees became the third quarterback in NFL history to defeat all 32 teams, joining Brett Favre and Peyton Manning. He also became the fourth quarterback to throw 500 career touchdown passes, joining Favre, Manning, and Tom Brady.

Week 8
Adam Vinatieri set the record for career points scored, with 2,550, breaking a record previously held by Morten Andersen.
Adam Thielen tied Calvin Johnson's record for eight consecutive 100-yard receiving games.

Week 10
Julio Jones became the fastest player in NFL history to reach 10,000 receiving yards, doing so in 104 games. Jones broke the record previously held by Calvin Johnson, who took 115 games.
Larry Fitzgerald passed Terrell Owens to move to second on the all-time receiving yards list with 15,952 career receiving yards.

Week 11
The Kansas City Chiefs scored 51 points in a 54–51 loss to the Los Angeles Rams, the most points ever scored by a losing team in NFL history. The 105-point aggregate total is also the third highest in NFL history.
The Philadelphia Eagles 41-point loss to the New Orleans Saints is the largest margin of defeat by a defending Super Bowl champion in NFL history since the inception of the game in 1966.

Week 12
The Houston Texans won their eighth straight game following an 0–3 start, becoming the first team in NFL history to do so.
Philip Rivers completed 25 consecutive passes to start a game, breaking the record of 22 consecutive completions to start a game previously held by Mark Brunell. This streak also tied Ryan Tannehill's record of 25 consecutive passes at any point in a game.
Philip Rivers completed 28 out of 29 passes (96.6%), breaking the record for highest completion percentage in a game (minimum 20 attempts). The previous record was held by Kurt Warner who completed 92.3% of his passes.

Week 14
Derrick Henry became the second player in NFL history to record a 99-yard rushing touchdown, joining Hall of Famer Tony Dorsett who achieved this in 1982.

Week 15
Tom Brady became the fourth quarterback to reach 70,000 career passing yards.

Week 16
The New England Patriots won at least ten games for the 16th straight season, tying a record set by the 1983–98 San Francisco 49ers.
The Patriots clinched the AFC East for the tenth consecutive season (extending an NFL record for most consecutive years winning any division) and their tenth straight playoff berth, breaking the record of nine straight playoff berths previously held by the Dallas Cowboys (1975–83) and Indianapolis Colts (2002–10).
Zach Ertz set a new NFL record for the most catches in a single season by a tight end with 113, breaking a record previously held by Jason Witten.
Chris Jones recorded a sack in his 11th consecutive game this season, marking a new NFL record.

Week 17
George Kittle had 1,377 receiving yards on the season, breaking the record for most receiving yards by a tight end previously held by Travis Kelce.
Baker Mayfield threw his 27th touchdown pass of the season breaking the record for most touchdown passes by a rookie quarterback, previously shared by Peyton Manning and Russell Wilson.
Nick Foles completed 25 consecutive passes, tying a record held by Ryan Tannehill and Philip Rivers.

Divisional round
James White tied the all-time single-game playoff receptions record with 15. This record was previously set by Darren Sproles.
Julian Edelman caught his 94th post-season reception, moving him past Reggie Wayne for second place all-time, behind only Jerry Rice.

Super Bowl
The Patriots defeated the Rams, 13–3, setting a new record for fewest total points (16) scored in a Super Bowl, This record was previously held by Super Bowl VII, in which the Dolphins defeated the Redskins, 14–7 (21 points).
Tom Brady became the first player to win six Super Bowls, surpassing Charles Haley's record of five.

Regular season statistical leaders

Awards

Individual season awards 

The 8th Annual NFL Honors, saluting the best players and plays from 2018 season, was held on February 2, 2019, at the Fox Theatre in Atlanta, Georgia.

All-Pro team 

The following players were named First Team All-Pro by the Associated Press:

Players of the week/month 
The following were named the top performers during the 2018 season:

Head coaching and front office personnel changes

Head coaches

Off-season

In-season

Front office personnel

Off-season

In-season

Stadiums 
Two teams, the Carolina Panthers and Oakland Raiders, entered the final year of their lease agreements with their current stadium.

Carolina Panthers 
On December 17, 2017, Jerry Richardson, the Panthers' founding owner, announced he was putting the team up for sale. Richardson had previously indicated the team would be put up for sale after his death, but Richardson was accused of paying hush money to cover up questionable conduct, including racial slurs and sexually suggestive requests of employees, hastening Richardson's decision. The Panthers' lease on Bank of America Stadium expires after the 2018 season, which would allow any incoming owner to relocate the team out of Charlotte, North Carolina, to another market if they so desired, only being liable for the remaining debt from stadium renovation. At an estimated $35 million, the debt payment would be a small expense compared to the relocation fee the NFL charged for the two teams that relocated in 2016 and 2017. The two most likely candidates to buy the team  were David Tepper, a hedge fund manager with a higher net worth and a minority stake in the Pittsburgh Steelers but fewer ties to Charlotte; and Ben Navarro, a financial services CEO based in Charlotte who had the backing of Richardson's only living son. Tepper was announced as the new owner on May 16, with the announcement coming in time for the league to vote on his bid at the owners meeting on May 19. The sale closed on July 9 with Richardson-era chief operating officer Tina Becker (who ran the franchise after Richardson stepped away from operations) resigning. Tepper immediately stated the franchise would retain the Carolina Panthers name for the time being, but that a new stadium would likely be necessary; he stated that he hoped to build said stadium in Charlotte but would not guarantee the team remains there, claiming he did not know enough about the situation to guarantee the team stays in the Charlotte area.

Oakland Raiders 

The Raiders, prior to the 2017 season, committed to relocating to Las Vegas, Nevada, once a new stadium was constructed for them in 2020. In 2016, the Raiders signed a three-year extension with the Oakland Coliseum. In order to secure another season in Oakland, California, Coliseum management indicated in September 2017 that the Raiders would need to offer major concessions to compensate for the financial losses the Coliseum incurs by hosting Raiders games.

Naming rights agreements

Arizona Cardinals 
On September 4, University of Phoenix Stadium, the home field of the Arizona Cardinals, was renamed State Farm Stadium. The naming rights agreement is for 18 years; however, the cost of the deal was not disclosed.

Denver Broncos 
On June 20, the Denver Broncos' home stadium was renamed Broncos Stadium at Mile High. The sporting goods chain Sports Authority had held naming rights to the stadium's field (as "Sports Authority Field at Mile High") but had gone out of business in 2016. The previous signage referring to Sports Authority was removed in March. Just prior to the 2019 season, the naming rights were sold to Empower Retirement, ultimately renaming the stadium to "Empower Field at Mile High".

Jacksonville Jaguars 
On February 16, EverBank Field, the home field of the Jacksonville Jaguars, was renamed TIAA Bank Field, after TIAA's 2017 acquisition of EverBank. The naming rights agreement was for 10 years and $43 million.

Uniforms

Color Rush discontinuation 
The Color Rush program was discontinued, and teams were no longer required to wear the special uniforms for Thursday Night Football. Teams had the option to continue using the existing Nike designs for the program as standard third jerseys.

Uniform changes 

Chicago Bears: The Bears brought back their orange alternate jerseys that the team wore from 2005 to 2009 and 2011. The team announced that the orange uniforms will be worn twice in 2018, and the team will use the navy blue "Monsters of the Midway" throwbacks for one game.
Jacksonville Jaguars: On April 19, the Jaguars simplified their uniforms in a similar look they had used before 2013. Gold was also eliminated from their previous jerseys and the gradient black and gold helmet was reverted to an all-black gloss shell.
Los Angeles Rams: On July 27, the Rams announced that due to overwhelming fan demand the NFL relaxed their alternate uniform policy and has permitted them to use their royal blue and yellow throwbacks as their color jerseys for the next two seasons until they present entirely new ones in 2020. When using their white jerseys, the team will still have to use their current set carried over from St. Louis albeit from slight modifications they made to them in 2017.
Miami Dolphins: On April 19, the Dolphins simplified their uniform outlines to take after their classic aqua-and-orange look. Dark blue was removed from everything but the logo. For the second straight year, the Dolphins will wear their official throwback jerseys twice in 2018.
Tennessee Titans: On April 4, the Titans introduced new uniforms. Most prominent among the changes is the helmet, which is changing from the white color the team had used since the 1970s (as the Houston Oilers) to navy blue. The color patterns are also simplified, with a new number typeface inspired both by Greek lettering and the shape of the state of Tennessee.

Throwback uniforms 
Pittsburgh Steelers: On May 30, the Steelers unveiled a throwback uniform, that was worn in the late 1970s. Team owner Art Rooney II announced that the team will wear the uniforms for one game.
San Francisco 49ers: On May 23, 49ers unveiled a new all-white throwback uniform, that was worn in 1994, the year the team won its most recent Super Bowl. The team announced that they will be worn for one game.

Patches 
Green Bay Packers: On April 9, the Packers unveiled a patch to commemorate their 100th season.
Indianapolis Colts: On April 10, the Colts unveiled a patch to commemorate their 35th season in Indianapolis.
Los Angeles Chargers: The Chargers added a patch to commemorate the death of team owner Alex Spanos (and his wife Faye, who died in August) before Week 9's game against the Seahawks.
New Orleans Saints: On August 9, the Saints unveiled a patch to commemorate the death of team owner Tom Benson, featuring Benson in silhouette holding his second line umbrella above his initials.
Seattle Seahawks: On October 26, the Seahawks unveiled a patch to commemorate the death of team owner Paul Allen, featuring his "PGA" initials below the team's 12th Man flag.

Media

Broadcast rights

Television 
This was the fifth year under the current broadcast contracts with ESPN/ABC, CBS, Fox, and NBC. This included "cross-flexing" (switching) Sunday afternoon games between CBS and Fox before or during the season (regardless of the conference of the visiting team). NBC continued to air Sunday Night Football, the annual Kickoff game, and the primetime Thanksgiving game. ESPN continued to air Monday Night Football and the Pro Bowl, with the latter being simulcast on ABC. CBS broadcast Super Bowl LIII.

On January 31, the NFL announced that Fox had acquired the broadcast television rights to the Thursday Night Football package under a five-year deal (aligned with the remainder of the NFL's current broadcast contracts). Fox aired 11 games, in simulcast with NFL Network, with the remaining games in the package airing exclusively on NFL Network to satisfy its carriage contracts (with local broadcasts syndicated broadcast stations in the markets of the teams in each game). CBS and NBC had made bids to renew their previous contracts (CBS had held the rights since 2014, joined by NBC since 2016), but were reluctant to pay a higher rights fee due to the league's ratings downturn.

This was the first season that the league implemented Saturday flexible scheduling for NFL Network's late season Saturday games. Thus, it also marked the first time that games would be rescheduled to a different day (excluding games rescheduled due to severe weather). Under this system, four week 16 games were initially designated as possible matchups to be moved to Saturday. The league would then announce no later than week 8 which two of those four games would be moved and which two would remain on Sunday.

Digital 
The NFL agreed to an extension of its digital rights agreement with Verizon Communications under a 5-year, $2.5 billion deal. Unlike the previous deal, it no longer includes exclusivity for streaming in-market and nationally televised NFL games on mobile devices with screens  or less in size (such as smartphones), in order to account for changes in viewing habits, but still includes enhanced access to highlights and other digital content for Verizon-owned properties. In addition, Verizon announced that it would no longer make these streams exclusive to Verizon Wireless subscribers, and would leverage its portfolio of media brands (such as Yahoo!, which it acquired in 2017) to distribute them to a larger audience. All of the NFL's current television partners have added mobile streaming rights (which were previously reserved to Verizon) to their existing contracts for the 2018 season, with telecasts becoming available via CBS All Access, the Fox Sports App, the ESPN app, and the NBC Sports app. Under the terms of the agreement, Verizon must give the majority of the advertising revenue to the broadcast partners.

On April 26, 2018, the NFL announced that it had reached a two-year extension of its agreement with Amazon for shared digital rights to the Thursday Night Football games simulcast with Fox, with a 15% increase in rights fees. To fulfill a request that the streams be available freely, the games will also be made available on Twitch, an Amazon-owned streaming service that was originally designed for video game streaming.

Radio 
Both of the NFL's national radio contracts, Westwood One for English language and Entravision for Spanish language, expired after the 2017 season. Westwood One's parent company Cumulus Media filed for bankruptcy in November 2017 and began terminating national broadcast contracts and sports agreements in January 2018, putting any contract extensions on hold. The company emerged from bankruptcy on June 4, 2018.

With the release of the 2018 schedule, NFL.com listed ESPN Deportes Radio (which had shared NFL rights with Entravision in 2017 and had carried Super Bowl LII) as the league's national Spanish-language broadcaster. The national English-language broadcaster was still identified as Westwood One, which Westwood One has also confirmed; no press release has been issued in regard to a contract extension with that network, and it is unknown when the current arrangement was signed or when it will end. Additionally, Westwood One removed Sunday afternoon games from their package, instead focusing on the primetime matchups as well as the postseason. SportsUSA, Compass and ESPN Radio, which also has broadcast select Sunday afternoon NFL games, will continue to do so. Meanwhile, Entravision extended the Sunday night rights for 3 years, through 2021, and gained two Super Bowls, the entire AFC Playoff package, the Thursday Night Opener, and a Thanksgiving Day game as part of their new deal.

Personnel changes 
All four broadcast partners will employ rules analysts for the 2018 season, citing changes in the league's rules that have become too complicated for its broadcast teams to handle. NBC hired Terry McAulay to be their rules analyst for Sunday Night Football. CBS hired Gene Steratore to fill their rules analyst position, a position that had been vacant since CBS released Mike Carey in 2015. ESPN hired Jeff Triplette for Monday Night Football. Fox retained both Mike Pereira and Dean Blandino. Additionally, Pereira assists with Fox's Thursday Night Football Coverage.

ESPN introduced a fully new broadcast team for Monday Night Football. Joe Tessitore replaced Sean McDonough as lead play-by-play man; McDonough will remain with ESPN as a college football announcer. With previous color analyst Jon Gruden returning to coaching, Monday Night Football hired Jason Witten and Booger McFarland as their color commentators; while McFarland offers his commentary from the sidelines, he fills a role similar to the "non-football" player position that Monday Night Football has traditionally relied upon in its past three-person booths (such as Howard Cosell, Dennis Miller and Tony Kornheiser). Lisa Salters, the sideline reporter, carries over from the previous broadcast team. Jeff Triplette will replace Gerald Austin as rules analyst.

Fox initially had planned to hire a new broadcast team for its Thursday Night Football, making an overture to Peyton Manning to serve as color commentator. Since Manning declined the offer, the network announced that it will be placing its existing lead broadcast team of Joe Buck and Troy Aikman on the package, reducing the number of games the duo will call on Sundays (Buck and Aikman will only call the nationally televised "America's Game of the Week" telecasts on Sundays). A version of Fox NFL Sunday will serve as the lead-in to Thursday Night Football, without Curt Menefee or Jimmy Johnson; the show will instead be hosted by panelist Michael Strahan from New York City, displacing Rich Eisen, the studio host for Thursday night pregame since the package's inception in 2006. Strahan will be joined by fellow Fox colleagues Terry Bradshaw and Howie Long.

In previous seasons, Buck did not call any NFL games during late October, working Major League Baseball playoff games instead. For 2018, Fox coordinated its schedule with MLB so that none of its scheduled broadcasts would land on a Thursday (Fox carries the NLCS and the World Series), so Buck will continue to broadcast both sports, crisscrossing the country in seven cities over a 22-day period.

In addition, NBC introduced a new studio team for Football Night in America. Mike Tirico, who was the on-site host and secondary play-by-play announcer in 2017, became the show's studio host from Stamford, Connecticut, while Liam McHugh moved into Tirico's former role. Dan Patrick, who had been the studio host for FNiA since 2008, declined to sign a long-term contract and left NBC.

On radio, Kurt Warner replaced Boomer Esiason as the color commentator for Westwood One's Monday Night Football broadcasts, after Esiason had filled the role for the previous 18 years. Esiason will continue as a studio host for CBS.

In a surprise announcement made two days before its first game, Amazon announced it would provide its own broadcast team for its eleven games, with Hannah Storm and Andrea Kremer serving as the lead broadcast team. The announcement makes Kremer the first-ever female color analyst for an NFL game, the first time a game has been broadcast with no men involved in the broadcast team, and the first time since the 1987 season of ESPN Sunday Night NFL that no former coach or player served on the broadcast team in any capacity. Amazon will offer the standard Fox broadcast team, a British broadcasting team, and a Spanish language feed as alternate audio choices.

Only one game into the pre-season, Indianapolis Colts announcer Bob Lamey, who had been with the team for most of the time since their 1984 relocation from Baltimore, retired suddenly after a complaint of him using a racial slur in the 1980s was revealed. Sideline reporter Matt Taylor was named his de facto replacement for the season.

Greg Papa, after 21 years calling play-by-play for the Oakland Raiders, joined the San Francisco 49ers as their play-by-play announcer; Papa cited an ongoing feud with Raiders owner Mark Davis for his departure. Replacing Papa with the Raiders is Brent Musburger, who came out of retirement from sports announcing to sign a three-year deal with the team that will see him serve as broadcaster through the team's relocation to Las Vegas (Musburger maintains a side business, the Vegas Sports Information Network, in Las Vegas).

Primetime game time shifts 
The kick-off times for all three primetime series were moved up to start 5 to 15 minutes earlier to facilitate local newscasts and SportsCenter to start earlier and cause less disruption to late night television schedules in the Eastern and Central time zones. Thursday and Sunday Night games now kick off at 8:20 p.m. ET, while Monday Night games now kick off at 8:15 p.m. ET.

Most watched regular season games 
After two years of decline, television viewership for the NFL slightly rebounded in 2018, with ratings up 3% as a whole through the first ten weeks of the season, despite a major decline (16%) in other programming on the same networks. The season finished with ratings up 5% compared to 2017.

DH = doubleheader; SNF = NBC Sunday Night Football

*Note – Late DH matchups listed in table are the matchups that were shown to the largest percentage of the market.

References 

 
National Football League seasons
NFL